Inanna Publications and Education Inc. is a Canadian book publisher based in Toronto, Ontario. Inanna publishes women's writing, including a journal, literary fiction, poetry, and academic books. Inanna's books are on a wide variety of feminist topics accessible to the largest possible community of women. Inanna "is bucking the trend – and flourishing." Most of Inanna Publications' books are collected at Harvard Library. Inanna's writers have won several Independent Publisher Book Awards and Canadian Jewish Book Awards, and have been shortlisted for the League of Canadian Poets's Raymond Souster Award, the Western Mail (Wales) Book of the Year, the Lambda Literary Foundation awards, and have been among the Toronto Book Award finalists.

History

Founded in 1978, Inanna Publications—whose name is related to Inanna, Goddess of Love, Wisdom, War, Fertility and Lust—started to publish an academic journal and books. In 2004, it launched the Inanna Poetry and Fiction Series.

Academic Journal

Inanna is the publisher for Canadian Woman Studies/Les Cahiers de la Femme, which is one of Canada’s oldest feminist journals.

Inanna Sales and Distribution
 Brunswick Books for Canada
 Small Press Distribution for the United States

References

Small press publishing companies
Feminist book publishing companies
Publishing companies established in 1978